Çamaltı can refer to the following villages in Turkey:

 Çamaltı, Araç
 Çamaltı, Bartın
 Çamaltı, Cide